Sangyuan could refer to the following towns in China:

Sangyuan, Huailai County, in Huailai County, Hebei
Sangyuan, Baoding, in Li County, Hebei
Sangyuan, Wuqiao County, in Wuqiao County, Hebei
Sangyuan, Shaanxi, in Xixiang County, Shaanxi
Sangyuan, Shandong, in Ju County, Shandong
Sangyuan, Sichuan, in Qionglai, Sichuan

See also
Shangyuan (disambiguation)